Thomas Willis Pratt, (born 1812, Boston, Massachusetts) was an American engineer. He is best known for his 1844 patent for the Pratt truss, which he designed with his father, Caleb Pratt. Pratt also surveyed the route of the Providence and Worcester Railroad in 1844. He died in 1875.

References

1812 births
1875 deaths
Engineers from Massachusetts
People from Boston
19th-century American inventors